This is a list of listed buildings in the southern part of the parish of Bonhill, in West Dunbartonshire, Scotland.  The northern part of Bonhill parish is within Argyll and Bute. See List of listed buildings in Bonhill, Argyll and Bute.

List 

|}

Key

Notes

References
 All entries, addresses and coordinates are based on data from Historic Scotland. This data falls under the Open Government Licence

Bonhill
Vale of Leven